Mukul Gopal Mukherjee (1934 – 28 February 2004) was a Bengali Indian jurist, who served as the Chief Justice of the Rajasthan High Court.

Early life and career
He was educated at the Scottish Church College and the law college at the University of Calcutta. Between 1999 and 2000, he had served as the chief justice of the Rajasthan High Court. He had subsequently served as the chairperson of the West Bengal Human Rights Commission. His early education was at Hare School.

Death
Mukherjee died on 28 February 2004.

References

1934 births
2004 deaths
Chief Justices of the Rajasthan High Court
20th-century Indian judges
Scottish Church College alumni
University of Calcutta alumni